Genlisea repens is a corkscrew plant native to South America.

References 

repens
Carnivorous plants of South America
Flora of Brazil